Blackwell is an unincorporated community in Washington County, in the U.S. state of Virginia.

Crabtree-Blackwell Farm was listed on the National Register of Historic Places in 1975.

References

Unincorporated communities in Virginia
Unincorporated communities in Washington County, Virginia